Caseolus calvus is a species of small air-breathing land snail, terrestrial pulmonate gastropod mollusks in the family Geomitridae, the hairy snails and their allies.

Subspecies 
 Caseolus calvus calvus (R. T. Lowe, 1831)
 Caseolus calvus galeatus (R. T. Lowe, 1862)

The subspecies Caseolus calvus galeatus (R. T. Lowe, 1862) endemic to Madeira is globally extinct.

Distribution 
This species of land snail lives in Madeira, Portugal.

References

Endemic fauna of Madeira
Molluscs of Europe
calvus
Gastropods described in 1831
Taxa named by Richard Thomas Lowe